Bétheny is a commune in the Marne department in northeastern France.

Population

Personalities 
 Marie Drouet (1885-1963) died there

See also
Communes of the Marne department

References

Communes of Marne (department)